Phlegmacium luteiaureum is a species of fungus in the family Cortinariaceae.

Taxonomy 
The species was described in 2014 and classified as Cortinarius luteiaureus. It was placed in the subgenus Phlegmacium of the large mushroom genus Cortinarius.

In 2022 the species was transferred from Cortinarius and reclassified as Phlegmacium luteiaureum based on genomic data.

Etymology 
The specific epithet luteiaureum (originally luteiaureus) refers to the yellow colour of the cap.

Habitat and distribution 
Found in northern Finland, where it grows on the ground in coniferous forest.

See also
List of Cortinarius species

References

External links

luteiaureus
Fungi described in 2014
Fungi of Finland